Thorold's deer (Cervus albirostris) is a threatened species of deer found in grassland, shrubland, and forest at high altitudes in the eastern Tibetan Plateau. It is also known as the white-lipped deer (Baichunlu, 白唇鹿, in Simplified Chinese, ཤྭ་བ་མཆུ་དཀར།་ in Standard Tibetan) for the white patches around its muzzle.

This deer fills an ecological niche similar to the Tibetan red deer (shou, the subspecies wallichi of the red deer species group). It was first scientifically described by Nikolai Przhevalsky in 1883. As of early 2011, more than 100 Thorold's deer are kept in Species360-registered zoos, and in 1998 it was estimated that about 7000 remain in the wild.

Etymology
Although the species was first described by Przhevalsky in 1883, it is also known as "Thorold's deer" because the specimens was procured by G. W. Thorold in 1892 and was described by W. T. Blanford as Cervus thoroldi in 1893. The former genus, however, is named after Przhevalsky (Przewalskium) and the species name (albirostris) comes from the Latin  albus (white) and rostrum (snout), referring to the white muzzle and lips. The name also came from the Chinese word baichunlu (白唇鹿, simplified Chinese), meaning "white-lipped". For this reason, Thorold's deer is also commonly known as the white-lipped deer.

Taxonomy
Thorold's deer has traditionally been included in the genus Cervus, and genetic evidence suggests this is more appropriate than its erstwhile placement in the monotypic genus Przewalskium.

No subspecies are recognized.

Description
The hair is coarse and grey-brown over most of the body, fading to yellowish buff on the underparts, with a distinct reddish-brown patch on the rump, and a ridge of darker hair running down the spine. During winter, the coat is paler, and about twice as thick as during the summer, being thicker even that of a moose. The head is darker than the rest of the body, especially in males, and contrasts with pure white markings on the lips, around the nose, and the throat just below the chin.

Compared with those of wapiti or red deer, the antlers are flattened with the first and second ("bez") tines noticeably far apart. The antlers can have up to seven tines, which all lie in the same plane. They are shed annually in March, reaching their full length by late summer. Other distinctive features include longer ears than most other deer, lined with white hair, and large metatarsal and preorbital glands. The hooves are broad and heavy, with unusually long dewclaws.

Thorold's deer has a number of physical and physiological adaptations to its high altitude environment. The short legs and broad hooves make it an agile climber, able to use steep mountainous terrain to escape predators. Their nasal cavities are unusually large, allowing them to breathe in rarified high altitude air, while the thick hair protects against the cold. The red blood cells in this species are smaller than average for similarly sized mammals, and are very numerous, both features that increase its ability to take up limited amounts of oxygen.

Distribution and habitat
Thorold's deer inhabit the Chinese provinces of Tibet, Sichuan, Qinghai, Gansu, and far northwestern Yunnan. Today, they are found only in scattered populations across these regions, apparently being most numerous in eastern Sichuan. They prefer mosaics of grassland, shrubland, and forest, and are often seen above the treeline.

Behaviour
Thorold's deer is a crepuscular animal, normally living in herds of at least 10 individuals. Outside of the breeding season, males and females usually travel separately. Historically, herds containing hundreds of such deer were reported, but today, herds of over 100 individuals are rare. Like wapiti, they are predominantly grazers; they feed on a wide range of available plants, especially grasses and sedges, but including some larger plants such as rhododendrons and willows. They have few natural predators, although wolves and snow leopards have been known to eat Thorold's deer on occasion.

Like reindeer, they can also make unusual, loud snapping sounds from their carpal bones, the function of which is unclear. Thorold's deer rarely run, but they can gallop at up to 35 miles (56 km) per hour.

Reproduction

The rut occurs between September and November, when herds containing both males and females become more common. Such herds consist of several males, each maintaining a small harem of females that they protect from other males. Males compete with one another in a manner similar to other deer - wrestling with antlers, scent marking, visual displays, and grunting warning sounds. Mating consists of a single rapid thrust.

The female gives birth to a single young after a gestation period of 220 to 250 days, typically in either May and June. Shortly before giving birth, the mother locates a secluded den, often in bushes or shrubby cover. The calves are born with white spots, and able to stand within about 40 minutes of birth. Initially, the mother protects them by moving them between a number of different locations, only visiting them twice a day to allow them to suckle. After about two weeks, they rejoin the herd.

The calves' spots begin to fade after around six weeks, and they attain the full adult colour by the end of their first year. They become sexually mature during their second or third year, although males are rarely successful in the rut until they are at least five years old. Thorold's deer have been reported to live up to 21 years in captivity, but probably do not survive for more than 12 years in the wild.

Conservation
Thorold's deer is found only in scattered populations across its former range, although the remoteness of its preferred habitat makes it difficult to study in detail. It faces threats from advancing human agriculture, including competition from domestic animals such as sheep, goats, and yaks. It is also hunted, for meat, antlers, and other body parts (such as the velvet) used in traditional Chinese medicine. The species is listed as vulnerable by the IUCN and is a Class I protected species in China.

The species has been farmed for its antlers in China and New Zealand, and is also found in numerous zoos worldwide. It appears able to adapt to being kept at low altitudes without much difficulty.

See also
List of endangered and protected species of China

References

External links

Animal Info
WorldDeer
ChinaCulture

Thorold's deer
Fauna of Tibet
Mammals of China
Thorold's deer